Non Sang is a district (amphoe) in the southeastern part of Nong Bua Lamphu province, northeastern Thailand.

Geography
Neighboring districts are (from the west clockwise) Si Bun Rueang and Mueang Nong Bua Lamphu of Nong Bua Lamphu Province, Nong Wua So of Udon Thani province, Khao Suan Kwang, Ubolratana, Phu Wiang, and Nong Na Kham of Khon Kaen province.

History
The area of the district was originally a tambon of Mueang Nong Bua Lam Phu district. On 1 January 1948 it was made a minor district (king amphoe), which was upgraded to a full district on 9 June 1956.

Administration
The district is divided into 10 sub-districts (tambons), which are further subdivided into 104 villages (mubans). There are two sub-district municipalities (thesaban tambons). Non Sang covers tambon Non Sang and Kut Du parts of tambon Kut Du. There are a further nine tambon administrative organizations (TAO).

References

External links
amphoe.com (Thai)

Non Sang